Beauvais–Tillé Airport , branded as Paris-Beauvais Airport, is an international airport near the city of Beauvais in the commune of Tillé in France. In 2016, it was the tenth busiest airport in France, handling 3,997,856 passengers, and is mostly used by charter and low-cost airlines.

History

German use during World War II
This airport was built in the 1930s and seized by the Germans in June 1940 during the Battle of France. Beauvais was used as a Luftwaffe military airfield during the occupation. Known units assigned (all from Luftflotte 3, Fliegerkorps IV):

 Kampfgeschwader 76 (KG 76) June – 24 October 1940 Dornier Do 17Z-2 (Fuselage Code: F1+)
 Sturzkampfgeschwader 1 (SKG 1) July 1940 Junkers Ju 87B Stuka

The initial German use of the airport was as a bomber base. kg 76 and SKG 1 both took part in the Battle of Britain. kg 76 was reduced to 19 out of 29 serviceable machines by 18 August 1940. kg 76 raided London on 7 and 15 September 1940.

 Kampfgeschwader 26 (KG 26) September 1940 – February 1941 Heinkel He 111H (Fuselage Code: 1H+)
 Kampfgeschwader 77 (KG 77) 3–22 March 1941 Junkers Ju 88A-1 (Fuselage Code: 3A+)
 Kampfgeschwader 4 (KG 4) 30 June – 19 July 1941 Heinkel He 111H (Fuselage Code: 5J+)
 Kampfgeschwader 54 (KG 54) 9 July – 16 August 1942 Junkers Ju 88A-1 (Fuselage Code: B3+)
 Kampfgeschwader 6 (KG 6) December 1942 – February 1943 Junkers Ju 88A-1 (Fuselage Code: K6+)

With the Luftwaffe switching to night attacks on England, the badly damaged units at Beauvais were replaced by a series of He 111 and Ju 88A units that carried out anti-shipping missions (KG 26, KG 77) and night bombing missions over England (KG 4, KG 54, KG 6).

 Jagdgeschwader 26 (JG 26) 15 August – 3 October 1943 Focke-Wulf Fw 190A
 Jagdgeschwader 1 (JG 1) 6–30 June 1944 Messerschmitt Bf 109G

The increasing number and frequency of USAAF Eighth Air Force Boeing B-17 Flying Fortress and Consolidated B-24 Liberator daylight heavy bomber raids over occupied Europe and Germany made the Luftwaffe move out the bomber units and assign day interceptor fighter units to attack the American bombers as part of the Defense of the Reich. After the invasion of Normandy, elements of JG 1 were moved to France and were tasked with providing air support to the German army, along with their normal air defense role against Allied bombers.

In response to the interceptor attacks, Beauvais was attacked by USAAF Ninth Air Force Martin B-26 Marauder medium bombers and Republic P-47 Thunderbolt fighter-bombers with 500-pound general-purpose bombs, unguided rockets and .50 caliber machine gun sweeps when Eighth Air Force heavy bombers were within interception range of the Luftwaffe aircraft assigned to the base. The attacks were timed to have the maximum effect possible to keep the interceptors pinned down on the ground and be unable to attack the heavy bombers. Also the North American P-51 Mustang fighter-escort groups of Eighth Air Force would drop down on their return to England and attack the base with a fighter sweep.

American use
It was liberated by Allied ground forces about 3 September 1944 during the Northern France Campaign. Almost immediately, the United States Army Air Forces IX Engineer Command 818th Engineer Aviation Battalion cleared the airport of mines and destroyed Luftwaffe aircraft. Little battle damage was sustained, and the airport became a USAAF Ninth Air Force combat airfield, designated as Advanced Landing Ground "A-61" about 15 September, also being known as "Beauvais/Tille Airfield".

From Beauvais, the Ninth Air Force 322d Bombardment Group flew B-26 Marauder medium bombers from mid-September until March 1945. Once the combat unit moved east, the airport was used by transport units, flying in supplies from England and evacuating combat casualties on the return trip. The Americans returned full control of the airport to French authorities on 17 August 1945.

Development since the 1950s

In 1950, the Air Ministry offered to provide the wartime air base to NATO as part of the Cold War development of the alliance. Beauvais was selected to become a NATO Emergency airfield (Beauvais–Tillé Air Base), controlled by the French Air Force and intended for use by all NATO air forces to disperse their aircraft in case of war.

Demolition crews arrived and removed the wartime wreckage and any unexploded munitions were removed from the site. Funding shortages did not allow the construction of an 8000' jet runway, dispersal pads and other features found at a modern military airfield. Instead, in 1953 the NATO plans for Beauvais were discontinued and the airport was returned to private hands.

In 1956 (or possibly slightly earlier) Beauvais–Tillé was rebuilt as a civil airport and reopened for commercial use. It was the French end of the world's first low-cost Coach-Air service, linking London to Paris via Lympne, operated by Skyways. Redevelopment began in 2005. The airport then had three gates, housed within a marquee tent while the permanent facilities were being redeveloped.

Evidence of its wartime history is present around the threshold of runway 22, northeast of the airport, with about 500 metres (1600 feet) of the runway end being the unused surface of the wartime runway, complete with several bomb craters left by the Ninth Air Force bomber attacks and some single-lane concrete roads, being the remainders of wartime taxiways. In addition, ruins of the support technical site remain to the northeast of the airport, near the commune of Morlaine, with connecting taxiways and the foundations/rubble of what appears to be buildings or an aircraft hangar. Wartime dispersal revetments in a wooded area, also connected by taxiways, remain.

Facilities

Control tower
The new control tower is active since 22 January 2019. It is located on the southern side of the airport and is replacing the one of 1962, sitting between the two terminals.

Runway
The main runway has an Instrument landing system CAT III for runway 12 and CAT I for runway 30 plus a Precision Approach Path Indicator (PAPI) for runway 12. A PAPI will also be installed for runway 30 at the end of 2019. This enables aircraft to land at the airport in bad weather conditions, with visibility as low as 75 metres.

Terminal
When the low-cost airline Ryanair chose Beauvais–Tillé in May 1997 for three daily connections with Dublin, the terminal of this regional airport consisted of a simple hangar built in 1979. Since then four additional stations for planes and in 2010 a second terminal of  had to be built to face a significant increase in traffic. The airport is equipped to handle medium-sized passenger jets. Since 2007 the ban on night flying has been strictly enforced for the benefit of local residents. The terminal building closes between the hours of 23:30 and 06:30. The airport has two terminals, some restaurants, snack bars, and shopping areas, both airside and in the publicly accessible area. An Ibis Budget hotel, which provides 78 rooms, has been built next to Terminal 2.

Airlines and destinations
The following airlines operate regular scheduled and charter flights at Beauvais–Tillé Airport:

Statistics

Passengers

Movements

Access

Road transport
The airport is linked with Paris city through coach and rail services. Travel time to Paris is 75 minutes by coach which drops off and collects passengers beside the Palais des Congrès at Porte Maillot, located in the 17th arrondissement, approximately a kilometre west of the Arc de Triomphe. There are also minibus and shuttle services that go to Paris.

There is also a taxi rank at the airport.

A commuter bus provided by the Transports Urbains du Beauvaisis runs to Beauvais town centre:
Line 12: Mairie – Zone d’activités des Tilleuls – Tillé – Aéroport
Airport Shuttle: Airport – Parc Municipal – Maillart – Cathédrale – Mairie (City Hall) – Gare SNCF (railway station) – Kennedy – Descartes – Délie – Saint-Germain – Elispace – Airport

Railway connection

See also
 Advanced Landing Ground
 List of the busiest airports in France

References

External links

 Official website 
 Aéroport de Beauvais – Tillé at Union des Aéroports Français 
 
 

Airports in Hauts-de-France
Buildings and structures in Beauvais
World War II airfields in France
Airfields of the United States Army Air Forces in France
Airports established in 1937